is a railway station in the city of Kamagaya, Chiba, Japan, operated by the private railway operator Shin-Keisei Electric Railway.

Lines 
Kamagaya-Daibutsu Station is served by the Shin-Keisei Line, and is 15.4 kilometers from the terminus of the line at Matsudo Station.

Station layout 
The station consists of one island platform with an elevated station building.

Platforms

History
Kamagaya-Daibutsu opened on January 8, 1949.

Passenger statistics
In fiscal 2017, the station was used by an average of 14,721 passengers daily.

Surrounding area
This station is the nearest station to the Kamagaya Great Buddha and is directly south of Hatsutomi Station and north of Futawamukōdai Station.

See also
 List of railway stations in Japan

References

External links

  Shin Keisei Railway Station information 

Railway stations in Japan opened in 1949
Railway stations in Chiba Prefecture
Kamagaya